American Twilight is the fifth studio album by Crime & the City Solution, released on March 26, 2013 through Mute Records. The album was recorded after a 23-year hiatus that found the band relocating from Berlin to Detroit.

Track listing

Personnel 
Crime & the City Solution
Bronwyn Adams – violin, backing vocals
Simon Bonney – vocals
Danielle de Picciotto – autoharp, backing vocals
David Eugene Edwards – guitar, backing vocals
Troy Gregory – bass guitar, cello, backing vocals
Alexander Hacke – guitar, backing vocals
Matthew Smith – keyboards, backing vocals
Jim White – drums
Production and additional personnel
Churibina – backing vocals
Brandon Cooper – trumpet
Crime & the City Solution – production
David Feeny – production, engineering, mixing, mastering, pedal steel guitar
Tony Hamera – engineering
Casey Rice – engineering
Bradley Stern – tenor saxophone
Olga Volchkova – cover model

References

External links 
 

2013 albums
Crime & the City Solution albums
Mute Records albums